The Albertsons Boise Open presented by Chevron is a professional golf tournament in Idaho on the Korn Ferry Tour, played annually at Hillcrest Country Club in Boise. Held in mid-September for its first 23 years, the new September playoff schedule of the Web.com Tour in 2013 moved the Boise event up to late July. The event returned to mid-September in 2016, and became part of the Web.com Tour Finals as the penultimate event. The schedule was revised for 2019 and it moved to late August.

History
The tournament has been played every year since 1990, the first year of the tour, then known as the Ben Hogan Tour. It is one of four original tournaments on the current schedule. Future notable names in the top 20 that first year were Tom Lehman, John Daly, Jeff Maggert, and Stephen Ames; David Toms made the cut.

Golf has been played on the site since the 1920s, originally named Idaho Country Club. Established in 1940, Hillcrest Country Club has been the only home of the tournament since its inception.  The Boise Open was a 54-hole tournament for its first six years, a fourth round was added in 1996.

This stop in southwestern Idaho consistently offers one of the top purses on the Korn Ferry Tour. The 2019 purse is expected to be  with a winner's share of $180,000. The first purse in 1990 was $100,000, with a winner's share of $20,000; the first six-figure winner's share went to Tim Clark in 2000.

The 2003 event featured 13-year-old Michelle Wie, the youngest ever to play on the tour; she carded 78-76 and missed the cut by twelve strokes. 

Chris Tidland shot 264 (−20) to win by four strokes in 2008; Fran Quinn shot 270 (−14) in 2009 with a birdie on the final hole to edge third round leader Blake Adams by a single stroke. Hunter Haas shot 263 (−21) in 2010 to win by one stroke over Daniel Summerhays.

At the 2015 edition, retired Army Corporal Chad Pfeifer became the first veteran amputee to play on the Web.com Tour, but missed the cut. He lost his left leg in a 2007 explosion and earned entry through a sponsor exemption.
 
Albertsons, a major supermarket retailer in the western U.S., has been the title sponsor since 2002. The grocery chain was founded  by Joe Albertson in 1939 in Boise, and the company was headquartered in the city until 2006, when it was acquired by Supervalu of Eden Prairie, Minnesota.  The company has committed to sponsorship of the tournament through 2016.

Course layout
 Course in 2014

The nines are switched for the members, who play the original nine holes (north) first.

Winners

Source:

Bolded golfers graduated to the PGA Tour via the Korn Ferry Tour regular-season money list, in years that the event was not part of the Korn Ferry Tour Finals. In years that the event has been part of the Finals, all winners and runners-up have earned PGA Tour cards.

References

External links 

Coverage on the Korn Ferry Tour's official site

Korn Ferry Tour events
Golf in Idaho
Sports competitions in Boise, Idaho
Recurring sporting events established in 1990
1990 establishments in Idaho